James Grieve may refer to:

James Grieve apple, an old variety of apple
James Grieve (Scottish translator) (died 1773), Scottish translator, writer and physician
James Grieve (Australian translator) (born 1934), Australian translator of French literature
James Grieve (director)
James Grieve (footballer), English football forward active in the 1930s
James Grieve (Liberal politician) (1810–1891), Scottish Liberal politician
James Michael Trevlyn Grieve (1932–1995), Scottish journalist and political activist
James Nicol Grieve (1855–1918), farmer and political figure in Ontario, Canada

See also
Grieve (surname)